Rosenscheldiella is a genus of fungi in the family Venturiaceae.

Species
R. brachyglottidis
R. cinnamomi
R. concentrica
R. dysoxyli
R. eugeniae
R. heveae
R. indica
R. intermedia
R. litseae
R. oleariae
R. perseae
R. phoradendri
R. pullulans
R. pulverulenta
R. rapaneae
R. styracis
R. tropaeoli
R. ugandensis

References

External links
Rosenscheldiella at Index Fungorum

Venturiaceae